Viktoriya Borshchenko (born ; 5 January 1986) is a Ukrainian handballer player for the Ukrainian national team. She moved to Rostov-Don in June 2013.

References

1986 births
Living people
Ukrainian female handball players
Sportspeople from Kherson
Ukrainian expatriate sportspeople in Russia